X-Men: First Class is a comic book series published by Marvel Comics starring the original X-Men.

Publication history
The original series was an eight-issue limited series. It began in September 2006 and ended in April 2007. It was written by Jeff Parker and penciled by Roger Cruz. It was followed by a special issue in May 2007 and a monthly series that premiered in June 2007 with the same creative team.

Many of the series' stories are done in single issues, some are two-parters and multiple issue arcs. The original team of X-Men are wearing new costumes in the series. The series guest-stars many other characters, such as the Lizard, Quicksilver, Scarlet Witch, Man-Thing, Gorilla-Man, Doctor Strange, Invisible Woman, and Thor.

The series has spawned a few spin-offs, titles including the ongoing series Wolverine: First Class, and the miniseries Weapon X: First Class.

The ongoing series lasted sixteen issues and it was followed by Giant-Size X-Men: First Class special issue. Starting February 2009, a four-issue miniseries titled X-Men: First Class Finals encompasses volume 3. This ends with the team going on to the Krakoa island mission.

A new volume called Uncanny X-Men: First Class premiered in an August 2009 one-shot Uncanny X-Men: First Class Giant-Sized and concentrated on the team first introduced originally back in Giant-Sized X-Men #1.

Creative teams
 X-Men: First Class (vol. 1)
 Writer: Jeff Parker
 Pencils: Roger Cruz
 Inks: Victor Olazaba
 Colored by: Val Staples
 Lettered by: Nate Piekos
 Cover by: Marko Djurdjevic
 X-Men: First Class Special
 Writer: Jeff Parker
 Pencils: Kevin Nowlan, Paul Smith, Mike Allred, Nick Dragotta
 Inks: Kevin Nowlan
 Colored by: Kevin Nowlan
 Lettered by: Nate Piekos
 X-Men: First Class (vol. 2)
 Writer: Jeff Parker
 Pencils and Inks: Roger Cruz
 Colored by: Val Staples
 Lettered by: Nate Piekos
 Cover by: Eric Nguyen

Publications
 X-Men: First Class  (vol. 1) (8-issue limited series, September 2006 - April 2007)
 X-Men: First Class Special (one-shot, May 2007)
 X-Men: First Class (vol. 2) #1-16 (ongoing series, June 2007 - November 2008)
 Giant Size X-Men: First Class #1 (one-shot, November 2008)
 X-Men: First Class Finals #1-4 (February - May 2009)
 Giant Size Uncanny X-Men: First Class #1 (one-shot, August 2009)
 Uncanny X-Men: First Class #1-8 (September 2009 - April 2010)
 Wolverine: First Class #1-21 (ongoing series, May 2008 - January 2010)
 Weapon X: First Class #1-3 (January - March 2009)

Collected editions
The stories are being collected into trade paperbacks:

Film

The 2011 film X-Men: First Class acts as a prequel to the X-Men film trilogy. Though it shares the same title as the comic series, the plots share almost no resemblance.

Producer Simon Kinberg read the comics and suggested studio 20th Century Fox to adapt it. However, Kinberg did not want to follow the comic too much, as he felt "it was not fresh enough in terms of storytelling", considering them too similar to Twilight and John Hughes movies, and also because the producers wanted an adaptation that would introduce new, hitherto unexplored X-Men characters.

References

External links

2006 comics debuts
2007 comics debuts
2009 comics debuts
Defunct American comics